Ahmedabad Katra Express is the weekly Express train between Ahmedabad and Shri Mata Vaishnodevi Katra started on 25 January 2015.
It connects the Indian state of Gujarat to Vaishnodevi. It connects Gujarat, Rajasthan, Haryana, Punjab, Himachal Pradesh and Jammu and Kashmir. Runs with LHB coach and doesn't carry pantry car.

Route
The train runs via Mehsana, Palanpur, Abu Road, Firozpur and Jammu Tawi railway station.

Schedule

Rake sharing

19415/16 – Ahmedabad–Allahabad Weekly Superfast Express

Traction
ADI -> SVDK

As the route is not fully electrified it runs on a diesel loco based on Diesel Loco Shed, Vatva WDM-3D or WDM-3A.

Reversals

 FZR – Firozpur Cantonment railway station
 JUC – Jalandhar City Junction railway station
 ASR – Amritsar Junction railway station
 PTK – Pathankot Junction railway station

See also 

 Sarvodaya Express
 Jamnagar–Shri Mata Vaishno Devi Katra Express
 Hapa–Shri Mata Vaishno Devi Katra Sarvodaya Express

References 

Railway services introduced in 2015
Transport in Ahmedabad
Transport in Katra, Jammu and Kashmir
Express trains in India
Rail transport in Uttar Pradesh
Rail transport in Madhya Pradesh
Rail transport in Gujarat
Rail transport in Rajasthan
Rail transport in Delhi
Rail transport in Haryana
Rail transport in Punjab, India
Rail transport in Jammu and Kashmir